Nikolas Gelavis (born 15 June 1929) is  a former Australian rules footballer who played with South Melbourne and Footscray in the Victorian Football League (VFL).

Family
The son of Johannes "John" Gelavis (1898-1947), and Stavroula Gelavis (1908-2005), née Sarinas,
Nikolas Gelavis was born in Kalgoorlie on 15 June 1929.

Football

Subiaco (WAFL)
Gelavis began his senior career with Subiaco in the West Australian Football League (WAFL) and played from 1949 to 1951.

South Melbourne (VFL)
He was cleared from Subiaco to South Melbourne in 1952, and made his senior VFL debut in 1953.

Footscray (VFL)
Having not played a senior game for South Melbourne that season, Gelavis was cleared to Footscray on 12 June 1954. He played his first match for the Footscray First XVIII, against St Kilda, on 10 July 1954.

Sandringham (VFA)
In 1955 Gelavis moved to Sandringham in the Victorian Football Association.

Devonport (NWFU)
A mid-season job as a radio announcer in Tasmania led to Gelavis being given a clearance from Sandringham to Devonport in the North West Football Union (NWFU) competition.

On 12 May 1956 Gelavis represented the NWFU in an intrastate match against the Northern Tasmanian Football Association and was named among the best players.

Notes

References 	
 </ref>
 Gordon, Harry, "Migrant Sports Stars Among Our Top-Liners", The Good Neighbour, No.45, (October 1957), Department of Immigration, (Canberra), pp.4-5: the article includes a photograph of Nick Gelavis, the captain of a team from Perth's Hellenic Club, that played an Australian Rules Football match, in Melbourne, against a team from Melbourne's Olympic Club (alongside the Olympic Club's captain, Peter Kanis).]

External links 	
 Nick Gelavis's playing statistics from WAFL FootyFacts.
 		
 
 Nick Gelavis, The VFA Project.		
		
		
Living people		
1929 births	
Australian people of Greek descent	
Australian rules footballers from Western Australia		
Sydney Swans players		
Western Bulldogs players
Subiaco Football Club players
People from Kalgoorlie